Ramona is a 1961 West German musical film directed by Paul Martin and starring Senta Berger, Joachim Hansen and Ruth Stephan.

It was shot at the Spandau Studios in Berlin. The film's sets were designed by the art directors Paul Markwitz and Wilhelm Vorwerg.

Cast
 Senta Berger as Yvonne
 Joachim Hansen as Steinberg
 Ruth Stephan as Ellinor
 Georg Thomalla as Tom Kroll
 Judith Dornys as Ramona
 Willy Hagara as Montez
 Loni Heuser as Nannen
 Edith Schollwer as Hedwig
 Ralf Wolter as Delon
 Gerold Wanke as Pepe
 Peggy Brown
 Jimmy Makulis
 Roland Kaiser as Regieassistent
 Tutte Lemkow
 Katja Lindenberg
 Sara Luzita
 Blue Diamonds as themselves
 Jan & Kjeld as themselves
 The Jochen Brauer Sextet as themselves

References

Bibliography 
 Lutz Peter Koepnick. The Cosmopolitan Screen: German Cinema and the Global Imaginary, 1945 to the Present. University of Michigan Press, 2007.

External links 
 

1961 films
West German films
German musical comedy films
1961 musical comedy films
1960s German-language films
Films directed by Paul Martin
Gloria Film films
Films shot at Spandau Studios
1960s German films